The Waterloo Ducks Hockey Club, also known as the Waterloo Ducks, is a Belgian field hockey club based in Waterloo, Walloon Brabant. Both the first men's and women's team play in the highest division of Belgian field hockey.

In 2019 they became the first Belgian club to win the Euro Hockey League by defeating Rot-Weiss Köln from Germany 4–0 in the final.

Honours

Men
Men's Belgian Hockey League
Winners (5): 2005–06, 2008–09, 2011–12, 2012–13, 2013–14

Euro Hockey League
Winners (1): 2018–19

Women
Belgian national title
Winners (1): 2017–18

Current squad

Men's squad

Women's squad

References

External links
Official website

 
Belgian field hockey clubs
Waterloo, Belgium
Sport in Walloon Brabant
Field hockey clubs established in 1950
1950 establishments in Belgium